Case Closed: Zero's Tea Time, also known as , is a Japanese manga series written and illustrated by Takahiro Arai. It is a spin-off of the Case Closed manga by Gosho Aoyama, with Aoyama supervising the project, and is centered on the character Toru Amuro. The first part of the story was serialized in Shogakukan's Weekly Shōnen Sunday from May 2018 to May 2022. A six-episode anime television series adaptation by TMS Entertainment was broadcast from April to May 2022.

Arai launched another spin-off in Weekly Shōnen Sunday, titled Detective Conan: Police Academy Arc – Wild Police Story, which ran from October 2019 to November 2020.

Characters

He has three faces: he protects Japan as Rei Furuya of the Public Security Police, serves as an apprentice detective under Kogoro Mori as "Toru Amuro", and also infiltrates a black-ops organization under the code name "Bourbon".

Works at the Poirot coffee shop, located downstairs from the Mori Detective Agency.

A secretary supporting Eri Kisaki, who runs the Kisaki Law Office.

A public security police officer in the Public Safety Department of the Tokyo Metropolitan Police Department. He works hard to assist Amuro as his right-hand man.

A stray dog that suddenly appeared in front of the mortuary.

Media

Manga
Detective Conan: Zero's Tea Time is written and illustrated by Takahiro Arai and supervisioned by Gosho Aoyama. The first part of the story ran in Shogakukan's Weekly Shōnen Sunday from May 9, 2018, to May 25, 2022. Chapters of the manga were only published when Aoyama's main series Case Closed is on hiatus. Shogakukan has compiled its chapters into individual tankōbon volumes. The first volume was released on August 8, 2018. As of June 17, 2022, six volumes have been released.

Shogakukan Asia licensed the manga for English language release in Southeast Asia in January 2019.

Arai published another spin-off, titled Detective Conan: Police Academy Arc – Wild Police Story, which ran in Weekly Shōnen Sunday from October 2, 2019, to November 18, 2020.

Volume list

Anime
On October 4, 2021, it was announced that the manga would receive an anime adaptation. In November 2021, at Netflix's "Festival Japan" virtual event, it was revealed that they would stream the series. It is produced by TMS Entertainment and directed by Tomochi Kosaka, with scripts written by Yoshiko Nakamura, character designs handled by Kyōko Yoshimi, and music composed by Tomisiro. The series was broadcast for six episodes on Tokyo MX, ytv, and BS Nippon from April 5 to May 10, 2022. The opening theme is "Shooting Star" by RAKURA, while the ending theme is "Find the truth" by Rainy. The series premiered on Netflix outside of Japan on July 29, 2022.

Episode list

Reception
Detective Conan: Zero's Tea Time ranked 6th on the "Nationwide Bookstore Employees' Recommended Comics of 2018" ranking by the Honya Club website.

Notes

References

External links
  
  
 
 

2022 anime ONAs
Anime series based on manga
Case Closed
Comics spin-offs
Japanese-language Netflix original programming
Netflix original anime
Shogakukan manga
Shōnen manga
TMS Entertainment